

Peerage of England

|Earl of Cornwall (1068)||William Fitz-Robert, 2nd Earl of Cornwall||1095||1106||Forfeit
|-
|Earl of Chester (1071)||Hugh d'Avranches, 1st Earl of Chester||1071||1101||Died
|-
| ||Richard d'Avranches, 2nd Earl of Chester||1101||1120|| 
|-
|Earl of Shrewsbury (1074)||Robert of Bellême, 3rd Earl of Shrewsbury||1098||1102||Forfeit
|-
|Earl of Northampton (1080)||Simon I de Senlis, Earl of Huntingdon-Northampton||1080||1109||Died
|-
| ||Simon II de Senlis, Earl of Huntingdon-Northampton||1109||1153|| 
|-
|Earl of Albemarle (1081)||Stephen de Blois, 2nd Earl of Albemarle||1090||1127|| 
|-
|Earl of Surrey (1088)||William de Warenne, 2nd Earl of Surrey||1099||1138|| 
|-
|Earl of Warwick (1088)||Henry de Beaumont, 1st Earl of Warwick||1088||1119|| 
|-
|Earl of Buckingham (1097)||Walter Giffard, 1st Earl of Buckingham||1097||1102||Died
|-
| ||Walter Giffard, 2nd Earl of Buckingham||1102||1164|| 
|-
|Earl of Leicester (1107)||Robert de Beaumont, 1st Earl of Leicester||1107||1118||New creation

References

Lists of peers by decade
1100s in England
12th-century English people
Peers